Typhonium eliosurum is a species of plant in the arum family that is endemic to Australia.

Description
The species is a deciduous, geophytic, perennial herb, which resprouts annually from a rhizome up to 12 cm long and 2 cm in diameter. The deeply trilobed to triangular leaves are borne on stalks up to 40 cm long. The inflorescence, which is said to smell of pig faeces, is enclosed in a 22 cm long spathe, greenish on the outside and purplish-brown on the inside. The fruits are reddish and about 10 cm in diameter. Flowering takes place from late spring to early summer.

Distribution and habitat
The species is known from the Central Coast and South Coast regions of New South Wales, where it grows in damp areas near rainforest and on the banks of creeks.

References

 
eliosurum
Monocots of Australia
Flora of New South Wales
Taxa named by George Bentham
Taxa named by Ferdinand von Mueller
Plants described in 1878